The National Institute of Education (NIE) is an autonomous institute of Nanyang Technological University (NTU) in Singapore. Ranked 12th in the world and 2nd in Asia by the QS World University Rankings in the subject of Education in 2015, the institute is the sole teacher education institute for teachers in Singapore. 

NIE provides all levels of teacher education, ranging from initial teacher preparation, to graduate and in-service programmes, and courses for serving teachers, department heads, vice-principals and principals. Its enrolment stands at more than 5,600 full-time equivalent students. The institute was first established as the Teachers' Training College in 1950.

Programmes
NIE is organised into Programme Offices with 12 supporting Academic Groups. The Office of Teacher Education administers the initial teacher preparation programmes, leading to diploma, degree and postgraduate diploma qualifications, to equip student teachers with the knowledge to lead in the service of learners.

The Office of Graduate Studies and Professional Learning offers master's and doctoral degrees. The office also delivers in-service and leadership programmes to enhance the career pathways of serving teachers and educators.

The External Programmes Office was set up in October 2005 to act as an educational consultancy to meet the bespoke training requirements of local and international clients. In July 2009, this Office was renamed as NIE International, a private company and a subsidiary of NIE/NTU.

Research
NIE established the Centre for Research in Pedagogy and Practice in 2002 with funding from the Ministry of Education (MOE). As the largest education research centre in the Asia Pacific, the centre sits in the Office of Educational Research. It brings together researchers, educators and administrators research in and to develop new and innovative ways of teaching and learning.

In January 2005, NIE established the Learning Sciences Lab which is now part of the Office of Educational Research.  The Lab aims to lead and transform pedagogy enabled by ICT in teaching and learning in Singapore schools.  From a research base, findings and good ideas are conceptualised and applied in learning processes so that these are effectively implemented in the schools.

History 
The roots of NIE can be traced back to the Teachers' Training College (TTC) that was established in 1950, to meet the pressing need for teachers in Singapore. Between 1950 and 1971, the role of producing teachers was shared by the TTC and the School of Education at the University of Malaya (predecessor of the University of Singapore). TTC entered a new relationship with the University of Singapore in 1971, and resulted in the establishment of IE (Institute of Education) in 1973. The College of Physical Education (CPE) was set up in 1984 by IE to train specialist teachers in Physical Education. In 1991, IE and CPE merged to form NIE or the National Institute of Education. They occupied the campus at Bukit Timah Road, before moving to the main campus of the Nanyang Technological University in 2000.

International recognition
QS World University Rankings by Subject of Education 2013 published by Quacquarelli Symonds ranked NIE 10th in the world and 2nd in Asia ahead of top education faculties such as University of California, Berkeley and University of Toronto. One of NIE's executive programmes, the Leaders in Education Programme (LEP), has attracted international attention. The six-month programme prepares senior education officers for principalship. NIE received endorsement of its five-year strategic plan by an MOE-appointed International Advisory Panel, comprising academics from overseas universities, in August 2007.

Additionally, Singapore's education system and teacher education programmes were ranked among the world's best in a report by McKinsey and Company in September 2007.

Student clubs
The NTUSU consists of 16 constituent bodies, of which the NIE Student Teachers' Club is one. Only student teachers who are members of the NTUSU are eligible for full membership of the NIE Student Teachers' Club.

Student teachers of NIE other than those defined under ordinary membership and students from other schools in NTU may apply for affiliate membership subject to the approval of the Management Committee and recommendation of the Advisor of the Club.

The main role of the NIE Student Teachers' Club is to promote and safeguard the interests and welfare of student teachers in NIE, as encapsulated by its vision To Serve, to Provide, and Unite.

The Club achieves this by: promoting vibrancy on campus for a safe and lively environment that student-teachers feel at home in; organising events that lend a sense of vibrancy and active student life; and refining initiatives that care for the needs and wants of student-teachers in NIE. The Club also functions as the core vessel of communication between the students, subsidiary clubs, and NTU-NIE administration. Regardless of race, language, religion, and other lines of divide, the TTC takes pride in upholding equal treatment and equality for all student-teachers in NIE. 

The NIE Student Teachers' Club comprises the following sub-clubs and societies:

 Chinese Language Education and Research (CLEAR) Club
 Club ArNex
 Club Jeux
 Club Sci·napse
 DanceFuzion (DF)
 Deixus 
 Food and Consumer Sciences (FCS) Club
 Malay Language & Cultural Society (MLCS), NTU
 Physical Education and Sports Science (PESS) Club
 Service Learning Club (SLC)
 Tamil Language Club (TLC)
 Visual and Performing Arts (VPA) Club
 Graduate Student Club (GSC)

Together with its sub-clubs and societies, the NIE Student Teachers' Club organises a range of social, sports, cultural and educational activities for all student teachers.

References

External links
National Institute of Education Official website.
NIE Portal Student Portal for news, announcements, content and online services.
IN-Learning NIE Centre for Innovation in Learning
Trainee Teachers' Club A main student club of NIE
 Webometrics Ranking of World Universities

Education in Singapore
Nanyang Technological University